The Greater North Borneo languages are a proposed subgroup of the Austronesian language family. The subgroup covers languages that are spoken throughout much of Borneo (excluding the southeastern area where the Greater Barito languages are spoken), as well as parts of Sumatra and Java, and Mainland Southeast Asia. The Greater North Borneo hypothesis was first proposed by Robert Blust (2010) and further elaborated by Alexander Smith (2017a, 2017b). The evidence presented for this proposal are solely lexical.

The proposed subgroup covers some of the major languages in Southeast Asia, including Malay/Indonesian and related Malayic languages such as Minangkabau, Banjar and Iban; as well as Sundanese and Acehnese. In Borneo itself, the largest non-Malayic GNB language in terms of the number of speakers is Central Dusun, mainly spoken in Sabah.

Since Greater North Borneo also includes the Malayic, Chamic, and Sundanese languages, it is incompatible with Alexander Adelaar's Malayo-Sumbawan hypothesis.

History 
Blust connects the GNB expansion with the migration of Austronesian speakers into Maritime Southeast Asia. According to Blust, when Austronesian speakers came from the north through the Philippines, they split into three groups: one that went into Borneo, one that went into Sulawesi, and one that went into the Moluccas. After landing in Borneo, the first group was further split into two: one that moved along the northwestern coast facing the South China Sea, and another one that moved along the eastern coast. The language variety spoken by the northwestern group eventually developed into the Greater North Borneo languages.

Classification

Blust (2010) 
Robert Blust proposed a set of lexical innovations that defined Greater North Borneo. One of these innovations is *tuzuq replacing Proto-Malayo-Polynesian *pitu for 'seven'. The following subgroups are included:
North Borneo
Northeast Sabah
Southwest Sabah
North Sarawak
Kayanic
Kayan-Murik-Merap
Segai-Modang
Land Dayak
Banyadu-Bekati
Bidayuh-Southern Land Dayak
Malayo-Chamic
Malayic
Chamic
Sundanese
Rejang
Moken

While Blust assumed that all languages of Borneo other than those in Greater Barito subgroup with GNB, he does not attempt to explicitly classify several languages, including those with insufficient available data.
(unclassified)
Melanau
Kajang

Smith (2017a, 2017b) 
Smith recognizes an independent Central Sarawak branch within Greater North Borneo, combining the Melanau, Kajang and Punan–Müller-Schwaner languages. Additionally, he also excludes Moklenic from GNB and places it all the way up as one of the primary branches of Malayo-Polynesian.
North Borneo
Northeast Sabah
Southwest Sabah
North Sarawak
Central Sarawak
Melanau
Kajang
Punan–Müller-Schwaner
Kayanic
Kayan-Murik-Merap
Segai-Modang
Land Dayak
Banyadu-Bekati
Bidayuh-Southern Land Dayak
Malayo-Chamic
Malayic
Chamic
Sundanese
Rejang

Proto-Kayanic, Proto-Punan, Proto-Müller-Schwaner, Proto-Land Dayak, and Proto-Kenyah have also been reconstructed in Smith (2017a).

Austroasiatic influence
According to Roger Blench (2010), Austroasiatic languages were once spoken in Borneo. Blench cites Austroasiatic-origin vocabulary words in modern-day Bornean branches such as Land Dayak (Bidayuh, Dayak Bakatiq, etc.), Dusunic (Central Dusun, Bisaya, etc.), Kayan, and Kenyah, noting especially resemblances with the Aslian languages of peninsular Malaysia. As further evidence for his proposal, Blench also cites ethnographic evidence such as musical instruments in Borneo shared in common with Austroasiatic-speaking groups in mainland Southeast Asia.

Blench (2010) claims that lexical forms shared among Bornean and Austroasiatic languages include 'rain', 'to die', 'back (of body)', 'flying lemur', 'monkey', 'barking deer', 'lizard', and 'taro'.

Kaufman (2018) presents further evidence of words in various Austronesian languages of Borneo that are of likely Austroasiatic origin.

See also
Languages of Borneo

References

Bibliography

Further reading

 
 
 

 
Malayo-Polynesian languages